Friedrich "Fritz" Glatz (July 21, 1943 – July 14, 2002) was an Austrian racing driver from Vienna. He raced under the pseudonyms Pierre Chauvet and Frederico Careca as well as a number of others.

Career 
Glatz began his career in 1980 racing in the German Formula Three Championship. The following year he drove in that series as well as the European Formula Three Championship and made his European Formula Two Championship debut. He competed in 10 Formula Two races in 1982 for Bertram Schäfer Racing but failed to score points, with a best finish of 8th. In 1983 again made 10 Formula Two starts, this time for Emco Sports but only succeeded in finishing twice and scored no points. In 1984 he returned to Emco Sports and finally broke into the points with a 6th place at Donington Park, with his single point good enough for 15th in the championship. Formula Two gave way to International Formula 3000 in 1985 and "Chauvet" only attempted two races with Oreca, failing to finish both races. In 1986 he drove in Formula 3000 nearly full-time for Jordan Racing but had a best finish of just 14th and he failed to qualify once. He also drove in two World Sports-Prototype Championship races for two teams (Roy Baker Racing in Jerez and Martin Schanche Racing in the Nürburgring, failing to score points on both occasions). Glatz was away from racing in 1987 but in 1988 returned to Formula 3000 at 45 years of age racing full-time for Racetech 3000. However, after 3 failures to qualify in 6 races, he left the team and went to Madgwick International. His best finish on the season was 12th, out of the points. He also made 3 World Sports-Prototype Championship starts. In 1989 he made one start in the inaugural season of British Formula 3000, which was good enough for 13th in points. He made a handful of sports car starts throughout the 1990s, mainly in Interserie.

Death 

In 2002 he was driving a 1996-vintage Arrows Footwork FA17 Formula One car in a EuroBOSS race at Autodrom Most when his car bounced over a curb and became airborne. Glatz died from his injuries.

Racing record

Complete European Formula Two Championship results
(key) (Races in bold indicate pole position; races in italics indicate fastest lap)

Complete International Formula 3000 results
(key) (Races in bold indicate pole position; races in italics indicate fastest lap.)

References

1943 births
2002 deaths
Austrian racing drivers
Racing drivers who died while racing
German Formula Three Championship drivers
FIA European Formula 3 Championship drivers
European Formula Two Championship drivers
International Formula 3000 drivers
British Formula 3000 Championship drivers
World Sportscar Championship drivers
Sport deaths in the Czech Republic
Walter Lechner Racing drivers
Oreca drivers
Josef Kaufmann Racing drivers